Clarence Waldo Blethen (July 11, 1893 – April 11, 1973) was an American professional baseball pitcher with the Boston Red Sox and Brooklyn Robins of Major League Baseball as well as 18 seasons in minor league baseball. Blethen batted left-handed and threw right-handed. Blethen attended the University of Maine, where he played college baseball for the Black Bears from 1912 to 1915.

Blethen spent 18 years in organized baseball, almost all of it in the minor leagues. He pitched briefly for the Boston Red Sox in 1923 and did not have another opportunity until 1929, when he played with the Brooklyn Dodgers. In  seven major league games, he had no decisions and posted a 7.32 ERA with two strikeouts in 19-2⁄3 innings pitched.

Blethen suffered an unusual injury while playing for the Knoxville Smokies of the Southern Association in 1933. In a game on June 6th, the pitcher, who had false teeth and would put them in his hip pocket when he was running the bases, slid into second base, and the false teeth took a  bite out of him in what one news account called "a tender spot."

Following his majors career, Blethen spent seven years with the Atlanta minor league club winning 20 or more games in two seasons. He also played for several teams and managed Leaksville and Savannah in the late 1930s. After that, he took an active part in coaching little leaguers until the mid-sixties.

Blethen died in Frederick, Maryland at age 79.

References

External links

Retrosheet
The Deadball Era

1893 births
1973 deaths
Maine Black Bears baseball players
Baseball players from Maine
Boston Red Sox players
Brooklyn Robins players
Major League Baseball pitchers
Minor league baseball managers
Atlanta Crackers players
Frederick Hustlers players
Greenville Spinners players
Knoxville Smokies players
Leaksville-Draper-Spray Triplets players
Little Rock Travelers players
Macon Peaches players
Mobile Bears players
San Antonio Bears players
Savannah Indians players
Wilkes-Barre Barons (baseball) players
People from Dover-Foxcroft, Maine